Svenska Cupen 1946 was the sixth season of the main Swedish football Cup. The competition was concluded on 25 August 1946 with the Final, held at Råsunda Stadium, Solna in Stockholms län. Malmö FF won 3-0 against Åtvidabergs FF before an attendance of 15,173 spectators.

Preliminary round 1

For other results see SFS-Bolletinen - Matcher i Svenska Cupen.

Preliminary round 2

For other results see SFS-Bolletinen - Matcher i Svenska Cupen.

First round

For other results see SFS-Bolletinen - Matcher i Svenska Cupen.

Second round
The 8 matches in this round were played between 30 June and 10 July 1946.

Quarter-finals
The 4 matches in this round were played on 14 July 1946.

Semi-finals
The semi-finals in this round were played on 21 July 1946.

Final
The final was played on 25 August 1946 at the Råsunda Stadium.

Footnotes

References 

1946
Cup
Sweden